Buck Branch is a stream in Benton County in the U.S. state of Missouri. It is a tributary of Deer Creek.

Buck Branch was named after the bucks in the area.

See also
List of rivers of Missouri

References

Rivers of Benton County, Missouri
Rivers of Missouri